Hawaii Housing Authority v. Midkiff, 467 U.S. 229 (1984), was a case in which the United States Supreme Court held that a state could use eminent domain to take land that was overwhelmingly concentrated in the hands of private landowners and redistribute it to the wider population of private residents.

Background 
Only 22 landowners owned 72.5% of the fee simple titles in the island of Oahu, and the Hawaii State Legislature concluded that there was an oligopoly in land ownership that was "skewing the State's residential fee simple market, inflating land prices, and injuring the public tranquility and welfare."

However, the shortage of buildable land on Oahu was largely because roughly half of the island is government-owned and thus unavailable for privately-owned housing. 

The Hawaii legislature enacted a condemnation scheme, which was intended to transfer titles to the lots from its owner, the Bishop Estate, to the home lessees. The case focused on the taking of land held by the Bishop Estate, a charitable trust that held the residual lands of the Hawaiian monarchy, and used the proceeds to support the Kamehameha schools, which provide an education to Hawaiian children. The Bishop Estate had subdivided some of its land on Oahu and leased individual lots to land lessees, who built homes on them and at first paid nominal rents to the estate. 

However, as Oahu land values rose, so did rents, and the tenants demanded the state acquire the Estate's title and reconvey the individual lots to the lessee-homeowners, who would have to pay fair market value to reimburse the state for the acquisition.

Decision 
The Court's decision looked to Berman v. Parker (1954) in which eminent domain power had been used to redevelop slum areas and for the possible sale or lease of the condemned lands for private interest.

The Court decided that the United States Congress had the power to determine what was for the public good over the judiciary. The decision equated police power with the eminent domain of the sovereign's public use requirement.

In an 8-0 decision, the Court voted that the Hawaiian act was constitutional. Hawaii's act to regulate the oligopoly was seen as a classic exercise of the State's police powers, and a comprehensive and rational approach to identifying and correcting market failure and satisfied the public use doctrine. Land did not have to be put into actual public use in order to use eminent domain. It is the taking's purpose, and not its mechanics that were important. Here, eminent domain was used to provide an overall market benefit to the wider populace.

The decision suggested that a judicial deference to the legislature was involved. If the legislature determines there are substantial reasons for the exercise of the taking power, courts must defer to the legislature's determination that the taking will serve a public use.

The Court held that the takings to correct concentrated property ownership was a legitimate public purpose.

Limitations of the decision 
The decision, though, placed limits on the power of the government, stating:

Aftermath 
However, the aftermath of the Midkiff decision failed to achieve the stated purpose of the redistribution legislation. It could not create new housing because it transferred title from the land lessor only to the lessee-homeowners who already occupied existing homes on the subject property. As soon as the former lessees acquired fee simple titles to their homes, their homes became attractive to Japanese investors who paid high prices for those homes, largely in the upscale Kahala and Hawaii Kai neighborhoods. That led to a ripple effect throughout the island.

Home prices on Oahu, far from falling, as had been intended by the legislature, surged upward and more than doubled within six years.

The primary holding of Midkiff was reaffirmed by Kelo v. City of New London (2005).

See also
List of United States Supreme Court cases, volume 467

References

External links

United States Supreme Court cases
United States Supreme Court cases of the Burger Court
United States land use case law
Legal history of Hawaii
1984 in United States case law
Takings Clause case law
Public housing in the United States
History of Oahu
1984 in Hawaii